Rikard Östlin (born 16 January 1994 in Karlshamn) is a Swedish footballer who plays for Asarums IF as a left back.

Career
Östlin started playing football for local club Högadals IS before joining Blekinge's biggest club Mjällby AIF, for which he debuted in Allsvenskan with in 2013. Earning a starting position for Mjällby 2014, playing four league games during the Summer, Östlin picked up a one-year-long injury in late July. He went on loan to Division 2 club Asarums IF during the autumn 2015, but picked up another injury after only three league games. He however signed a long term contract with the club in April 2016.

References

External links

Asarums IF profile

1994 births
Living people
Swedish footballers
Allsvenskan players
Superettan players
Mjällby AIF players
Association football fullbacks
People from Karlshamn
Sportspeople from Blekinge County